Joyce Goldstein (born July 17, 1935) is an American chef, who is a two time James Beard Foundation Award winner. She ran the influential San Francisco-based restaurant Square One between 1984 and 1996.

Career
Joyce Goldstein worked as executive chef at the cafe within Chez Panisse for three years. She was the founder of the first international cooking school in San Francisco, California Street Cooking School. As well as working as a chef, she taught kitchen design at the University of California. Her first cookbook, The Mediterranean Kitchen, was published in 1989. She has since written cookbooks on Mediterranean and Jewish cuisines.

Goldstein ran her restaurant Square One in San Francisco between 1984 and 1996. While there, she had a daily changing menu of Mediterranean cuisine and had an influence on the restaurant scene in the city. To celebrate Goldstein's 80th birthday in 2015, the team from Square One reformed for a single night's service.

Awards
Goldstein was added to the James Beard Foundation Awards Who's Who of Food & Beverage in America in 1985. She was then nominated for specific awards on several more occasions, winning twice; first in 1993 in the General book category for Back to Square One: Old World Food in a New World Kitchen, and then again the following year for Best Chef California.

References

External links

Living people
American women chefs
American chefs
Chefs from California
James Beard Foundation Award winners
Jewish American chefs
1935 births
University of California faculty
Businesspeople from San Francisco
American women academics
21st-century American Jews
21st-century American women
Chefs from San Francisco
Chefs from Berkeley, California